Vénus Khoury-Ghata (born 1937 in Bsharri, Lebanon) is a French-Lebanese poet and writer.

Early life
Venus Khoury-Ghata was born into a Maronite family, the daughter of a soldier that spoke French and a mother that was a peasant. She is the older sister of the author May Menassa. In 1959, she won the Miss Beirut Pageant.

To escape the war in Lebanon she immigrated to France and married French doctor Jean Ghata, son of Turkish calligrapher Rikkat Kunt and her second husband Fahreddin Ghata. She has lived in Paris since 1972 and has published several novels and collections of poems.

Her daughter Yasmine Ghata is also a renowned writer.

Career 
Venus Khoury-Ghata undertook literary studies at L'École Supérieur Des Lettres de Beirut. She published her first literary collection in 1966 and 1967 "Terres Stagnantes", "Chez Seghers", and then in 1971 she published her first novel, "Les Inadaptés".

In 2009, she received the Grand Prix de Poésie of the French Academy and the Goncourt Prize for Poetry in 2011.

In 2018, she became a member of the Parliament of French-speaking writers alongside many writers, including Sedef Ecer, Paula Jacques and Khadi Hane.

Literary Awards 

 Guillaume Apollinaire Prize for The Shadows and Their Cries (1980)
 Mallarmé Prize for Monologue du mort (1987)
 Jules-Supervielle Prize for Personal Anthology 
 Prix Nice-Baie-des-Anges for Le Moine, l'ottoman and the wife of the great treasurer
 SGDL Grand Prize for Poetry (1993) for all of her work 
 Jules-Janin Prize of the French Academy (2005)
 Grand Prize for Poetry of the French Academy (2009) 
 Guillevic Grand Prize for Poetry of Saint-Malo (2010)
 Goncourt Prize for Poetry for her body of work (2011) 
 Pierrette-Micheloud Poetry Prize for Where are the trees going? (2012)
 Renaudot Pocket Book Prize for The fiancée was on the back of a donkey (2015) 
 Geneviève Moll Biography Prize for The Last Days of Mandelstam (2017)

Honors 
 Knight of the Legion of Honor (December 15, 2000)
 Officer of the Legion of Honor (July 13, 2010) 
 Commander of the Legion of Honor (June 13, 2017)

Work 
 Les visages inachevés, (Unfinished faces) 1966
 Les inadaptés, (The Maladjusted ones) novel, Le Rocher, 1971
 Au Sud du silence, (South of Silence) poems, Saint Germain des Prés, 1975
 Terres stagnantes, (Stagnant Lands) poems, Seghers
 Dialogue à propos d’un Christ ou d’un acrobate, (Dialogue about a Christ or an acrobat) novel, Les Editeurs Français Réunis, 1975
 Alma, cousue main ou Le Voyage immobile, (Alma, Sewed Hand or the Immobile Trip) R. Deforges, 1977
 Les ombres et leurs cris, (Shadows and their Screams) poems, Belfond, 1979
 Qui parle au nom du jasmin ?, (Who Talks in the Name of Jasmine?) Les Editeurs Français Réunis, 1980
 Le fils empaillé, (The Stupid Son) Belfond, 1980
 Un faux pas du soleil, (Sun Mistake) poems, Belfond, 1982
 Vacarme pour une lune morte, (Muddle for a Dead Moon) novel, Flammarion, 1983
 Les morts n’ont pas d’ombre, (Words Have No Shadows) novela Flammarion, 1984
 Mortemaison, (Deathhouse) novel, Flammarion, 1986
 Monologue du Mort, (Monologue of a Dead Man) novel, Belfond, 1986
 Leçon d’arithmétique au grillon, (Lesson about Arithmetic for a Cricket) poems for children, Milan, 1987
 Bayarmine, novel, Flammarion, 1988
 Les fugues d’Olympia, (Escapes from Olumpus) novel, Régine Deforges/Ramsay, 1989
 Fables pour un peuple d’argile,   Un lieu sous la voûte,  Sommeil blanc, (Fables for Clay People, A Place under the Vault, White Dream) poems, Belfond, 1992
 La maîtresse du notable (the Command of the Remarkable Man) novel, Seghers, 1992
 Ils, (They) poems, Amis du musée d’art moderne, 1993
 Les fiancés du Cap-Ténès, (Cap-Ténès’ Fiancés) novel, Lattès, Lattès 1995
 Anthologie personnelle, (Personal Anthology) poems, Actes Sud, 1997
 Une maison au bord des larmes, (A House at the Tearside) novel, Balland, 1998
 La maestra, (The Teacher) 1996, collection Babel, 2001
 Elle dit, Les sept brins de chèvrefeuille de la sagesse, (She Says, Seven Blades of Wisdom Honeysuckle) poems, Balland, 1999
 La voix des arbres, (Voice of Trees) poems for children Cherche-Midi, 1999
 Alphabets de sable, (Sand Alphabets) poems, illustrated by Matta, tirage limité, Maeght, 2000
 Le Fleuve, Du seul fait d’exister, (The River, The Simple Fact of Existing) with Paul Chanel Malenfant, Trait d’Union, 2000.
 Version des oiseaux, (Bird Version) poems, illustrated by Velikovic, François Jannaud, 2000
 Privilège des morts, (Privilege of Dead) novel, Balland, 2001
 Compassion des pierres, (Compassion of Stones) poemas, La Différence, 2001
 Zarifé la folle, (Mad Zarifé) François Jannaud, 2001
 Le Moine, l’ottoman et la femme du grand argentier, (The Monk, The Ottoman Man and The Eminent Algerian’s Wife) novel, Actes Sud, 2003
 Quelle est la nuit parmi les nuits, (Which is the Night of Nights) Mercure de France, 2004
 Six poèmes nomades, (Six Nomad Poemas) with Diane de Bournazel, Al Manar, 2005
 La Maison aux orties, (Nettle House) Actes Sud, 2006
 Sept pierres pour la femme adultère, (Seven Stones for Adulterous Women) roman, Mercure de France, 2007

References

External links
  Biographie et bibliographie
"Vénus Khoury-Ghata: in conversation with Corinna Hasofferett", Jacket 18

1937 births
Living people
Lebanese novelists
20th-century Lebanese poets
Lebanese women writers
Lebanese women poets
People from Bsharri District
Prix Guillaume Apollinaire winners
Lebanese emigrants to France
21st-century Lebanese poets
20th-century French women writers
21st-century French women writers
Officiers of the Légion d'honneur